Notobothrus is a genus of flies in the family Dolichopodidae. It contains only one species, Notobothrus longilamellatus, which is known from the lowland Amazonian Peru and northwestern Brazilian Acre State. It was formerly placed in the subfamily Neurigoninae, but was moved to Peloropeodinae by Naglis in 2002. In 2020, the genus was excluded from the Peloropeodinae and provisionally left incertae sedis within Dolichopodidae.

References

Dolichopodidae genera
Dolichopodidae
Diptera of South America
Monotypic Diptera genera
Invertebrates of Peru
Insects of Brazil